Tarremah Steiner School is a Steiner School in Huntingfield, Tasmania, Australia. It offers education for children up to grade 10, as of 2009.

Established in 1988, Tarremah was originally located in Warneford Street, South Hobart. It moved to its current location in 1992.

Tarremah is a member of Steiner Education Australia.

See also
 List of schools in Tasmania
 Education in Tasmania

Notes

External links
Tarremah Steiner School website
Steiner Education Australia

Private primary schools in Tasmania
High schools in Hobart
Waldorf schools in Australia
Educational institutions established in 1988
1988 establishments in Australia